Hulda from Holland is a 1916 American silent drama film directed by John B. O'Brien that was produced by Famous Players Film Company and released by Paramount Pictures. It stars Mary Pickford, then the biggest movie star in America. The story is an original for the screen called Miss Jinny.

Plot
Upon the death of her parents, little Hulda find herself sole guardian of her three small brothers. Fortunately, she receives a letter from her wealthy Uncle Peter in Pennsylvania inviting the three orphans to come to America and live with him. Shortly afterwards, Uncle Peter drives to the Port of New York to pick them up, but is injured by an automobile accident and taken to a hospital where he lies unidentified. Uncle Peter's disappearance not only causes distress to the three newly arrived Dutch immigrants, but also to a railroad president, Mr. Walton, who is trying to buy the right-of-way through Uncle Peter's farmland and has only three deals left in which to close the deal. The search for the old man by both Hulda and Mr. Walton's son result in a blossoming romance between the two.

Cast
Mary Pickford as Hulda
Frank Losee as John Walton
John Bowers as Allan Walton
Russell Bassett as Uncle Peter
Harold Hollacher as Little Jacob
Charles E. Vernon as The Burgomaster

unbilled
Cesare Gravina as Apartment Neighbor

Preservation status
The film survives in two European film archives.

References

External links

Alternate lobby poster

1916 films
Silent American drama films
American silent feature films
Films based on short fiction
Paramount Pictures films
1916 drama films
American black-and-white films
Films directed by John B. O'Brien
1910s American films